Margarete Hielscher (September 12, 1899 in Arnsdorf – April 13, 1985 in Stadtroda) was a German doctor, who was involved in Nazi crimes in the context of "child euthanasia". Margarete Hielscher propagated in 1930 a segregation of mentally handicapped people whom she described as "hereditary inferiority". During the Second World War, she led under the hospital clinic director Gerhard Kloos – euphemistically called – "Children's Department" at the Thuringia State Hospitals Stadtroda, which was affiliated to the youth psychiatric department; the children admitted there, at least 72 died through food deprivation or lethal injection.

References

1899 births
1985 deaths
German women physicians
20th-century German physicians
Euthanasia doctors
Euthanasia in Germany
People from Arnsdorf
20th-century women physicians
20th-century German women